Rubus probus, commonly known as Atherton raspberry or wild raspberry, is a scrambling shrub in the family Rosaceae native to Malesia and Queensland.

Atherton raspberry is a rampant grower and, like most Rubus species, can form dense thorny thickets. The fruits are edible.

It has been commercially cultivated to a limited extent in Australia as a cool season punnet fruit.

References

External links
 
 
 Map of recorded sitings of Rubus probus at the Australasian Virtual Herbarium

probus
Flora of Papua New Guinea
Bushfood
Flora of Australia
Plants described in 1923